The Moultrie Commercial Historic District, in Moultrie in Colquitt County, Georgia, is a  historic district which was listed on the National Register of Historic Places in 1994.  The district is roughly bounded by NE. First Ave., SE. Second Ave., W. First St. and E. Fourth St.  In 1994, the district included 61 contributing buildings and one contributing object.  It also included 17 non-contributing buildings.

The district included three properties which were already separately listed on the National Register:
Colquitt County Courthouse (1902), listed in 1980, designed by A.J. Bryan and Company
Colquitt County Jail (1915), listed in 1980
Carnegie Library of Moultrie (1909), listed in 1982, designed by T.F. Lockwood.

The district includes Colquitt Towers, a former hotel which was called Colquitt Hotel, a four-story Colonial Revival-style building with balustrade and urns on roof and on arched openings.

References

External links

Historic districts on the National Register of Historic Places in Georgia (U.S. state)
Late 19th and Early 20th Century American Movements architecture
Art Deco architecture in Georgia (U.S. state)
Buildings and structures completed in 1914
National Register of Historic Places in Colquitt County, Georgia